"Setting Sun" is a song by English electronic music duo the Chemical Brothers featuring vocals from Noel Gallagher of Britpop band Oasis, who also co-wrote the track with duo members Tom Rowlands and Ed Simons. He is not mentioned on the front cover, only in the credit list. It was released as a single on 30 September 1996 from the Chemical Brothers' second album, Dig Your Own Hole (1997). Despite receiving little airplay in the United Kingdom, it sold 99,000 copies during its first week of release and debuted at number one on the UK Singles Chart in October 1996. American magazine Rolling Stone included "Setting Sun" in their list of the "200 Greatest Dance Songs of All Time" in 2022.

Composition
Gallagher used an old Oasis song, "Comin' on Strong", as the basis for the lyrics to "Setting Sun". Both songs are heavily influenced by the Beatles' Revolver track "Tomorrow Never Knows".

Critical reception
Upon release, "Setting Sun" was critically acclaimed by music critics. J. D. Considine from The Baltimore Sun complimented the "ear-catching sounds" of "shrieking klaxons and braying trumpets", picking it as one of three best songs from Dig Your Own Hole. He felt that songs like "Setting Sun" "come on like mini-amusement parks, offering so many sonic thrills that you can't help but want to ride the groove again." Daina Darzin from Cash Box named it Pick of the Week, adding, "Techno, synthcore, dance, industrial, whatever you wanna call it, this is the single du jour—a downright amazing, explosive, whirling, get-your-feet-moving rush of a thing that you're guaranteed to play, like, 37 times in a row after hearing it for the first time." 

Caroline Sullivan from The Guardian rated it five out of five, picking it as Single of the Week. She wrote, "The Brothers' disjointed breakbeats, sirens and trapped-in-a-lift ambiance are glorious foils for Gallagher, who seems to be having an out-of-body experience. It's hallucinatory in the manner of one of Led Zeppelin's heaviest moments, where sonic firepower and grubby sexiness induced sensory overload." Sally Stratton from Music & Media noted the track's "wails and explosions". David Fricke from Rolling Stone remarked its "vertiginous Beatlemania".

Music video
The accompanying music video for the song was directed by Dom and Nic. It was shot on location at the abandoned Crystal Palace Subway station and features artist Lexi Strauss. In the video, it shows the prospect of a rave party through the eyes of a bewildered young woman. It can be seen the woman chasing a personification of her nightmare through the party. The video mixes a disturbing psychological confusion with moments of humoristic imagination (for example, the woman sees police dancing breakdance). The Chemical Brothers briefly appear, leaving the party with their record cases.

Impact and legacy
In 2010, Pitchfork ranked "Setting Sun" number 43 in their list of the "Top 200 Tracks of the 1990s". In 2020, The Guardian called it, alongside Underworld's "Born Slippy .NUXX", the "most experimental and sonically extreme hit [single] of the 90s" and ranked it number 49 on their list of "The 100 Greatest UK No 1 Singles". In 2022, Rolling Stone ranked it number 82 on their list of the "200 Greatest Dance Songs of All Time".

Track listings

Credits and personnel
Credits are lifted from the Dig Your Own Hole album booklet.

Studios
 Recorded at Orinoco Studios (South London, England)
 Mastered at The Exchange (London, England)

Personnel
 The Chemical Brothers – production
 Tom Rowlands – writing
 Ed Simons – writing
 Noel Gallagher – writing, vocals
 Jon Dee – engineering
 Mike Marsh – mastering

Charts and certifications

Weekly charts

Year-end charts

Certifications

References

1996 songs
1996 singles
Astralwerks singles
The Chemical Brothers songs
Noel Gallagher songs
Songs written by Ed Simons
Songs written by Noel Gallagher
Songs written by Tom Rowlands
UK Singles Chart number-one singles